Leycesteria is a genus of flowering plants in the honeysuckle family Caprifoliaceae, native to temperate Asia in the Himalaya and southwestern China.

It contains six or seven species of shrubs with short-lived stems with soft wood, growing to 1–2.5 m tall. One species, Leycesteria formosa (Himalayan honeysuckle or flowering nutmeg), is a popular garden shrub in Britain.

Leycesteria was named for William Leycester, a horticulturist in Bengal in about 1820.

References

Flora of China: species list
Flora of Nepal: species list

Caprifoliaceae
Caprifoliaceae genera
Taxa named by Nathaniel Wallich